Alianza Frigorífico was a Peruvian association football club, located in the city of Lima. The club was founded with the name of club Atlético Frigorífico and played in Primera Division Peruana in 1931. The club was third place of the national tournament in 1931 and the same year Alianza Frigorífico was relegated and it was their last appearance in the Primera Division Peruana.

Honours
División Intermedia:
Winners (1): 1930

See also
List of football clubs in Peru
Peruvian football league system

External links
 RSSSF - Peru - List of Champions
 Peruvian football seasons - 1931

Football clubs in Lima